Margaritiflabellum is a genus of problematic Ediacaran fossil from the Russian White Sea region.

Etymology 
The generic epithet comes from the Latinized Greek word margarita, meaning “pearl”, and Latin flabellum, “fan”. The specific epithet honors Anatoly Fedorovich Stankovsky,

Description 
The fossils consist of fan-like imprints in negative relief on sandstone. The fossils exhibit an outer band-like fringe. Numerous small or rare large pits are scattered on the imprints, except on the outer fringe, which may be smooth or folded. Rock within the imprint is frequently enriched in microgranular pyrites, the concentration of which increases near the inner impression and sometimes on the fringe. Imprints are usually deformed, being stretched in longitudinal and transverse directions. Length ranges from 6 to 57 mm, and width from 7.3 to 63 mm.

Discovery 
Margaritiflabellum anatolii was described in 2014 by A.Y. Ivantsov, based on the holotype and 18 other specimens. No other species of Margaritiflabellum have been named.

Distribution 
Margaritiflabellum anatolii was discovered in the Arkhangelsk region on the southeast coast of the White Sea. The fossils occur in the Late Ediacaran lower part of the Erga Formation, associated with a ‘lense’ or local abundance of Kimberella.

See also 
 List of Ediacaran genera
 List of White Sea biota species by phylum

References 

Ediacaran life
White Sea fossils
Fossil taxa described in 2014